Japanese words of Dutch origin started to develop when the Dutch East India Company initiated trading in Japan from the factory of Hirado in 1609. In 1640, the Dutch were transferred to Dejima, and from then on until 1854 remained the only Westerners allowed access to Japan, during Japan's sakoku seclusion period.

In the process, a number of terms were adopted from Dutch into the Japanese language. At one point, some 3,000 words are thought to have been used, especially in the areas of technical and scientific vocabulary. About 160 such words of Dutch origin remain in use today in standard Japanese.

See also
 Gairaigo
 List of gairaigo and wasei-eigo terms
 Japanese words of Portuguese origin

References

Further reading
  (PDF) - Originally in Lingua 12 (1963): pp. 341–88.

External links
 Which Japanese words originate from Dutch?

Japanese Words Of Dutch Origin
Dutch
Japanese Dutch
Linguistics lists
Words of Dutch origin
Dutch language in Asia
Wikipedia glossaries using tables